The Daily Camera is a newspaper in Boulder, Colorado, United States. It is owned by Prairie Mountain Publishing, a division of Digital First Media.

History
Frederick P. Johnson and Bert Bell founded the weekly Boulder Camera in 1890, and it became a daily in 1891.  Ownership has changed over the years. The paper has been owned by Ridder (1969–1974), Knight Ridder (1974–1997), Scripps (1997–2009) and MediaNews Group (2009–present). In 2013 MediaNews Group and Digital First Media merged under the Digital First Media name. 

The official name of this newspaper at various times has been the Boulder Camera, the Boulder Daily Camera, the Daily Camera, the Camera, and most recently the Daily Camera once again.  All of these are still in common usage as nicknames for the paper.

Awards
 2007 Missouri Lifestyle Journalism Award for General Excellence, Class II
 2006 Missouri Lifestyle Journalism Award for General Excellence, Class II

References

External links
 
 MediaNews Group daily newspapers
 Digital First Media

Daily newspapers published in the United States
Newspapers published in Colorado
Mass media in Boulder, Colorado
Publishing companies established in 1891
1891 establishments in Colorado
Digital First Media